The 1975 Pittsburgh Panthers football team represented the University of Pittsburgh in the 1975 NCAA Division I football season. The Panthers won the Sun Bowl.

Schedule

Roster

Coaching staff

Team players drafted into the NFL

References

Pittsburgh
Pittsburgh Panthers football seasons
Sun Bowl champion seasons
Pittsburgh Panthers football